Aydın Doğu Demirkol (born 6 September 1988) is a Turkish comedian and actor.

Personal life 
Demirkol was born in Ankara. His mother was a lawyer originally from Mersin and his father was a doctor from Balıkesir who was of Circassian descent. He went to middle school in Amasya and finished high school in Ankara. He later graduated from Istanbul University with a degree in computer engineering.

Career

Early years 
Demirkol first became known for sharing comedy videos on his social media accounts, and he subsequently took part in Yetenek Sizsiniz Türkiye as a contestant in 2012. In 2015, he hosted the Açık Mikrofon show at Beşiktaş Cultural Center. In 2016, together with other Açık Mikrofon hosts, including Yavuz Günal, Tuna Kalınsaz, Murat Gençoğlu, and Yusuf Altıntaş, he performed the stand-up show Eski Açık. After getting positive reactions for his performance there, he was invited to join the  TV program for a short stand-up performance.

In 2016, together with Kalben he appeared in a five-minute commercial for Garanti BBVA. In the sketch, titled Fakat O Ne, he portrayed a man who has difficulty in making it to the end of the month, while having dramatic daily expenditures.

Rise to prominence
Demirkol made his cinematic debut in 2018 with his role as Zafer in Ölümlü Dünya, which was directed by Ali Atay. In the same year, he appeared as Sinan Karasu in Ahlat Ağacı, which was directed by Nuri Bilge Ceylan and screened at the 2018 Cannes Film Festival.

In 2019, he appeared in 25-episode mockumentary for Garanti Emeklilik, titled Parayı Tutamayan Adam, which saw him portray a man struggling to keep his money in his pocket, and when he was about to lose his future and loved ones he meets a coach and learns how to manage his finances.

In 2020, he landed his first television role on the TRT 1 series Tutunamayanlar, in which he played the role of Tarık Şakrak. In the same year, he appeared as Adem Ballı in the movie Bayi Toplantısı, the script for which was written by İbrahim Büyükak.

In the same year, his duet with Mustafa Sandal, titled "Tekrar", was published with a short as well as a long music video. Both versions contained references to Sandal's old music videos.

In 2022, Demirkol was chosen as a judge for FOX's reality singing competition Maske Kimsin Sen? alongside Eda Ece, Melis Sezen and Alican Yücesoy. In September 2022, he began presenting his own talk show  on Star TV. He additionally appeared in Turkcell's "Turkey's Digital Stories" commercial series.

Filmography

Discography 
Single
 2021: "Tekrar" (feat. Mustafa Sandal)

Awards

References

External links 
 
 

1988 births
Living people
Male actors from Ankara
Turkish people of Circassian descent
Turkish television actors
Turkish film actors
Turkish comedians
21st-century Turkish male actors
Istanbul University alumni